The 1997 HEW Cyclassics was the second edition of the HEW Cyclassics cycle race and was held on 10 August 1997. The race started and finished in Hamburg. The race was won by Jan Ullrich.

General classification

References

1997
1997 in German sport
Hew Cyclassics
August 1997 sports events in Europe